The Pune metropolitan area consists of:

Old city

This area consists of areas which were part of Pune before the arrival of the British in 1818. This area consists of 17 peths. This area is today called as Old city.

Other areas under PMC Administration
In the late 19th century, Pune city started expanding and nearby villages were absorbed into Pune Municipal Corporation. The earliest villages were Shivajinagar, Parvati, Wanwadi and Yerwada. As of 2018, below villages have been absorbed in the city.

Ambegaon Budruk
Aundh 
Baner 
Bavdhan Khurd
Bavdhan Budruk
Balewadi
Shivajinagar
Bibvewadi
Bhugaon
Bhukum
Dhankawadi
Dhanori
Dhayari 
Erandwane
Fursungi
Ghorpadi
Hadapsar
Hingne Khurd
Karve Nagar
Kalas
Katraj 
Khadki
Kharadi
Kondhwa
Koregaon Park
Kothrud
Lohagaon
Manjri 
Markal
Mohammed Wadi
Mundhwa
Nanded
Parvati (Parvati Hill)
Panmala
Pashan 
Pirangut 
Shivane
Sus
Undri
Vishrantwadi
Vitthalwadi
Vadgaon Khurd
Vadgaon Budruk
Vadgaon Sheri 
Wagholi 
Wanwadi
Warje 
Yerwada

Areas under PCMC Administration 
In 1970s, due to increased industrialisation on Mumbai–Pune Highway, many villages around the highway were merged to form PCMC, Pune. The earliest villages which were absorbed were Pimpri, Chinchwad, Dapodi, Bhosari etc. Till 2018, below villages have been absorbed in the city.

Akurdi
Bhosari
Chakan
Charholi Budruk
Chikhli
Chimbali
Chinchwad
Dapodi
Dehu Road
Dighi
Dudulgaon
Hinjawadi
Kalewadi
Kasarwadi
Maan
Moshi 
Phugewadi
Pimple Gurav 
Pimple Nilakh
Pimple Saudagar
Pimpri
Ravet
Rahatani
Sangvi
Talawade 
Tathawade 
Thergaon
Wakad

Areas around Vadgaon
In 1970s, due to increased industrialisation on Mumbai–Pune highway, villages around Vadgaon Maval (a taluka town in Pune district) were developed. These are:

Ambi
Parandwadi
Somatne
Talegaon
Urse
Vadgaon Maval
Varale

Cantonment areas
These are the permanent military areas established by the British.

Pune Cantonment, formed by borrowing land from the villages of Wanwadi, Ghorpadi and Munjeri.
Khadki Cantonment, formed by borrowing land from the villages of Bopodi, Bhamburde (now called Shivajinagar) and Aundh.
Dehu Road Cantonment, formed by borrowing land from the villages of Dehu, Kiwale, Mamurdi and others.

References

See also
 List of roads in Pune

Neighbourhoods in Pune
Maharashtra-related lists